Bradford speedway may refer to:
Odsal Boomerangs 1945 - 1950 
Odsal Tudors 1950 - 1956
Bradford Tudors 1957 
Bradford Panthers 1959 - 1962  
Bradford Northern (speedway) 1970 - 1973 
Bradford Barons 1974 - 1976 
Bradford Dukes 1986 - 1997